Upper Chandler Pond is a  pond in Duxbury and Pembroke, Massachusetts. The pond is located north of Lower Chandler Pond and east of West Chandler Pond. The pond is the headwaters to Pine Brook, a tributary of the Jones River. The pond is hydro logically associatied with two nearby cranberry bogs. The water quality is impaired due to non-native aquatic plants and non-native fish in the pond.

External links
Environmental Protection Agency
South Shore Coastal Watersheds - Lake Assessments

Ponds of Plymouth County, Massachusetts
Duxbury, Massachusetts
Pembroke, Massachusetts
Ponds of Massachusetts